Health and History is a peer-reviewed academic journal published biannually by the Australian and New Zealand Society of the History of Medicine and covering the history of medicine in Australia and New Zealand. It was established in 1998 and is edited by Hans Pols (University of Sydney).

References

History of medicine journals
Biannual journals
Publications established in 1998
English-language journals